This is a list of the municipalities in the province of Cáceres in the autonomous community of Extremadura, Spain. There are 223 municipalities.

See also

Geography of Spain
List of Spanish cities

Caceres